Thomson Nature Park is a nature park in Singapore. Opened on 12 October 2019,  it is located adjacent to Central Catchment Nature Reserve near Old Upper Thomson Road.

Background
The park is being developed on the site of a former Hainan village which was established in the 1800s and abandoned in 1975.  It will be about 50 hectares in size.

One purpose of the park is to help conserve the biodiversity in the area. The park is one of five being developed in Singapore during the late 2010s near Central Catchment to increase the buffer between the park and the surrounding urban area and attract visitors who would otherwise visit the country's nature reserves.  Fauna living in the forested areas of the park include the Sunda pangolin, the Malayan porcupine, the samba deer, the leopard cat, the straw-headed bulbul, Malayan box turtle and the cinnamon frog.  It is also intended to help conserve the Raffles' banded langur, a type of leaf monkey which is critically endangered within Singapore and whose small Singapore population often feeds in nearby forest.  Trees in the park will include several species of Ficus, angsana and common pulai.  Besides enjoying nature, park visitors will be able to see the remains of the Hainan village.  

Groundbreaking of the project was marked by Singapore's Second Minister for National Development planting a Radermachera pinnata tree.  According to Lee: "These buffer parks protect the Central Catchment (Nature Reserve) from fringe effects. If you have roads, development right up to the nature reserve, you will subject it to all the impacts of the urban setting...Having these nature parks near but not within the reserve will allow members of the public to enjoy the outdoors with their families and that takes pressure off our very precious nature reserve."

Opening 
Thomson Nature Park opened on 12 October 2019. It has five trails spanning 3.8km into previous kampung areas. Now it is Singapore's newest and seventh nature park.

Kampung routes 
Besides the site of a deserted Hainan Village, the trails in the park also covers extensive forest areas. You may encounter rich wildlife along the trails.

References

2019 establishments in Singapore
Parks in Singapore
Important Bird Areas of Singapore
Nature parks